The 2023 ATX Open was a WTA 250 tournament organised for female professional tennis players on outdoor hard courts as part of the 2023 WTA Tour. The event took place at The Westwood Country Club in Austin, United States, from 27 February through 5 March 2023, marking a return of WTA Tour to Texas after an eleven-year absence.

Champions

Singles

  Marta Kostyuk def.  Varvara Gracheva, 6–3, 7–5

Doubles

  Erin Routliffe /  Aldila Sutjiadi def.  Nicole Melichar-Martinez /  Ellen Perez, 6–4, 3–6, [10–8]

Singles main draw entrants

Seeds

 Rankings are as of February 20, 2023.

Other entrants
The following players received wildcards into the singles main draw:
  Mirjam Björklund 
  Elizabeth Mandlik
  Peyton Stearns

The following player received entry using a protected ranking into the singles main draw:
  Taylor Townsend

The following players received entry from the qualifying draw:
  Katie Boulter
  Louisa Chirico
  Ashlyn Krueger
  Ann Li
  Robin Montgomery
  Heather Watson

The following players received entry as lucky losers:
  Erika Andreeva
  Nao Hibino
  CoCo Vandeweghe

Withdrawals 
Before the tournament
  Lauren Davis → replaced by  Nao Hibino
  Viktorija Golubic → replaced by  Harriet Dart
  Anhelina Kalinina → replaced by  Dayana Yastremska
  Jasmine Paolini → replaced by  Katie Volynets
  Emma Raducanu → replaced by  CoCo Vandeweghe
  Alison Van Uytvanck → replaced by  Dalma Gálfi
  Zhang Shuai → replaced by  Erika Andreeva

Doubles main draw entrants

Seeds 

 1 Rankings as of February 20, 2023.

Other entrants 
The following pairs received wildcards into the doubles main draw:
  Charlotte Chavatipon /  Sabina Zeynalova
  Ashlyn Krueger /  Robin Montgomery

Withdrawals 
  Miyu Kato /  Aldila Sutjiadi → replaced by  Erin Routliffe /  Aldila Sutjiadi
  Yana Sizikova /  Alison Van Uytvanck → replaced by  Anna Blinkova /  Yana Sizikova

References

External links

2023 in tennis
Tennis in the United States
Austin Texas Open
Austin Texas Open
Austin Texas Open
ATX Open